Lebakeng Airport  is an airport serving the settlement of Lebakeng, Lesotho.

The airstrip sits on a narrow ridge, with rising terrain to the west and a steep drop into a river valley off the east end. That, combined with the high elevation and short length, means users must exercise caution.

See also

Transport in Lesotho
List of airports in Lesotho

References

External links
OpenStreetMap - Lebakeng
Lebakeng Airport - FallingRain
OurAirports - Lebakeng

Airports in Lesotho